Martyrs & Madmen: The Best of Roger Daltrey is a compilation album of Roger Daltrey recordings issued in 1997.  The CD was released on Rhino Records R2 72846 USA.

Track listing 

 "One Man Band"  (David Courtney, Leo Sayer)  3:53
 "It's a Hard Life"  (Courtney, Sayer)  3:39
 "Giving it All Away"  (Courtney, Sayer)  3:26
 "Thinking"  (Courtney, Sayer)  4:25
 "World Over"  (Paul Korda)  3:13
 "Oceans Away"  (Goodhand-Tait)  3:19
 "One of the Boys"  (Gibbons)  2:46
 "Avenging Annie"  (Pratt)  4:33
 "Say It Ain't So, Joe"  (Murray Head)  4:20
 "Parade"  (Goodhand-Tait)  3:44
 "Free Me"  (Russ Ballard)  4:00
 "Without Your Love"  (Billy Nicholls)  3:18
 "Waiting for a Friend"  (Nicholls)  3:25
 "Walking in My Sleep"  (Adey, Green)  3:28
 "Parting Should Be Painless"  (Kit Hain)  3:43
 "After the Fire"  (Pete Townshend)  4:37
 "Let Me Down Easy"  (Bryan Adams, Jim Vallance)  4:10
 "The Pride You Hide"  (Dalgleish, Daltrey, Tesco)  4:33
 "Under a Raging Moon" [Single Version]  (Downes, Parr)  4:34
 "Lover's Storm"  (Kelly, Usher)  3:53

References 

Roger Daltrey compilation albums
1997 greatest hits albums
Rhino Records compilation albums